Halocaridina rubra, the Hawaiian red shrimp or volcano shrimp is a small red shrimp of the family Atyidae, with the common Hawaiian name  (meaning "red shrimp").

Description and distribution
Such pools are referred to as anchialine pools (from the Greek  = near the sea). Halocaridina rubra is endemic to the Hawaiian islands, and most commonly found in anchialine pools in fresh lava substrates on Hawaii and Maui Island; it has also been found in limestone karst pools and hypogeal habitats in limestone on older islands, such as Oahu. Its habitat is unique and sparsely represented on five of the eight high Hawaiian Islands (Maui, Kahoolawe, Oahu, Molokai and Hawaii).

Ecology
 are herbivorous and detritivorous shrimp occupying both hypogeal (subterranean) and epigeal (surface) anchialine waters. Chelipeds are adapted for scraping and filtering of algal-bacterial layers. Serrated setae scrape the substrate surface, and filamentous setae collect the loosened food materials. The latter can also act as filters for filter feeding during phytoplankton blooms. The grazing activity of this shrimp is essential in maintaining the integrity of the crust, an actively growing matrix of plants, bacteria, diatoms, protozoans, and underlying siliceous and carbonate materials. Halocaridina is well adapted to the epigeal-hypogeal habitat in the pools. It reproduces in the subterranean portion of the habitat.

Aquaria
A long-lived species,  have been known to live for as long as 20 years in captivity. Sexes are difficult to distinguish, but gravid females carry clusters of red/maroon eggs under their pleopods, and early larvae are planktonic filter-feeders.

They occasionally molt their shells, which can be seen as silvery exoskeletons at the bottom of the tank. There may be some evidence that  mate after molting, or that molting and mating may be related.

Stressed ʻōpaeʻula tend to hide, though if given plenty of places to hide they are more likely to venture into open spaces.  are social creatures and are rarely seen fighting, in fact when unstressed they often cluster together while eating or sunbathing. Shrimp in tanks can also be seen cleaning themselves or swimming slow laps.

The shrimp is the animal element of the Ecosphere closed-system aquarium.

References

Further reading

Atyidae
Crustaceans of Hawaii
Endemic fauna of Hawaii
Crustaceans described in 1963
Taxa named by Lipke Holthuis